Joseph Amos Hermas "Butch" Arbour (January 26, 1895 – November 1, 1943) was a Canadian professional ice hockey player. A left winger, Arbour played two seasons in the National Hockey Association and six seasons in the National Hockey League for Montreal Canadiens, Hamilton Tigers and Toronto St. Patricks. Arbour was a member of the 1916 Stanley Cup champion Montreal Canadiens team.

His World War I attestation papers lists his trade or calling as a butcher.

He died in Orillia, Ontario.

Career statistics

Regular season and playoffs

Transactions
January 23, 1919 – Signed as a free agent by Montreal Canadiens
November 26, 1921 – Traded to Hamilton Tigers by Montreal with Harry Mummery for Sprague Cleghorn
December 14, 1923 – Traded to Toronto by Hamilton with Bert Corbeau and George Carey for Ken Randall, the NHL rights to Corb Denneny and cash

References

External links

1895 births
1943 deaths
Canadian ice hockey left wingers
Hamilton Tigers (ice hockey) players
Ice hockey people from Simcoe County
Montreal Canadiens (NHA) players
Montreal Canadiens players
Stanley Cup champions
Toronto 228th Battalion players
Toronto St. Pats players